The Gyrojet is a family of unique firearms developed in the 1960s named for the method of gyroscopically stabilizing its projectiles. Rather than inert bullets, Gyrojets fire small rockets called Microjets which have little recoil and do not require a heavy barrel or chamber to resist the pressure of the combustion gases. The result is a very lightweight and transportable weapon.

Long out of production, today they are a coveted collector's item with prices for even the most common model ranging above $1,000. They are rarely fired; ammunition, when available at all, can cost over $100 per round.

History 
Robert Mainhardt and Art Biehl joined forces to form MBAssociates, or MBA, in order to develop Biehl's armor-piercing rocket rounds. Originally developed in a .51 caliber, the cartridges were self-contained self-propelled rockets with calibers ranging from .49 and 6mm to 20mm.

A family of Gyrojet weapons was designed, including the pistol, the carbine and a rifle, as well as a proposed squad-level light machine gun and a needlegun known as the Lancejet; however only the pistol and carbine were built. The space age-looking carbines and an assault rifle variant with a removable grip-inserted magazine were tested by the US Army, where they proved to have problems. One issue was that the vent ports allowed humid air into fuel, where it made the combustion considerably less reliable. The ports themselves could also become fouled fairly easily, although it was suggested that this could be solved by sealing the magazines or ports.

Versions of the Gyrojet that were tested were inaccurate, cumbersome, slow loading, and unreliable. At best, a 1% failure rate was suggested; users quote worse figures, with many rounds that misfired the first time but later fired. Possibly these disadvantages could have been overcome in time, but the technology did not offer enough advantages over conventional small arms to survive.

The original designer Robert Mainhardt enlisted the help of his friend Nick Minchakievich of Pleasanton, California, before 1962, in helping to stabilize the projectiles or ammunition. Minchakievich first developed retractable fins after rear ignition proved too dangerous. But the retractable fins proved too expensive, requiring advanced machining during production. The two experimental calibers with retractable fins were 6mm and 13mm.

Rushed for a solution due to the possibility of large government contracts, Minchakievich then invented diagonal vented ports to make the projectiles or ammunition spin while advancing, stabilizing the projectiles gyroscopically, in the same manner as a rifle. This method was used in all the Mainhardt calibers for the Gyrojet. Minchakievich warned Mainhardt that rushing the project would only make the pistol shoddy and unreliable.

Working for free out of his Livermore Aerospace Plastics Lab, Minchakievich requested six more months to perfect an accurate projectile, and make the Gyrojet more famous than the Colt Peacemaker. Mainhardt and the Air Force declined as current ordnance and technology was in demand for Vietnam. Minchakievich even attempted a marketing strategy by enlisting the help of Gene Roddenberry in using the pistol on Star Trek. Although Roddenberry loved the Gyrojet, he wanted a "ray gun" and not a pistol that merely shot a rocket projectile, no matter how advanced for the twentieth century.

Design 

The inherent difference between a conventional firearm and a rocket is that the projectile of a conventional firearm builds up to its maximum speed in the barrel of the firearm, then slows down over its trajectory; the rocket continues to accelerate as long as the fuel burns, then continues its flight like an un-powered bullet. A bullet has maximum kinetic energy at the muzzle; a rocket has maximum kinetic energy immediately after its fuel is expended.

A firearm's rifled barrel must be manufactured to high precision and be capable of withstanding extremely high pressures; it is subject to significant wear in use. The Gyrojet rocket is fired through a simple straight, smooth-walled tube of no great strength.

Accuracy is increased by spinning the projectile. This is achieved for a bullet by being forced against spiral rifling grooves in the barrel. A rocket does not have enough initial energy to allow stabilization this way. Spin stabilization of the Gyrojet was provided by angling the four tiny rocket ports rather than by forcing the projectile through a rifled barrel. Combustion gases released within the barrel were vented through vent holes in it. Spin stabilization is limited in accuracy as a targeting technique by the accuracy with which one can point the launching tube and the accuracy with which the orientation of the projectile is constrained by the tube. The technique requires the shooter to have a line of sight to their target.

While test figures vary greatly, testers report that there was a sonic crack from some rounds, but only a hissing sound from others, suggesting that the maximum velocity varied from slightly below to slightly above Mach 1.

In 1965, the manufacturer of the pistol claimed 5-mil accuracy (about 17 MOA, or about 4.5 inches at 25 yards), worse than conventional pistols of the time. However, in later tests accuracy was very poor; the difference seems to have been due to a manufacturing flaw in later production runs which partially blocked one of the exhaust ports, creating asymmetrical thrust that caused the projectile to corkscrew through the air.

About 1000 of the "Rocketeer" model pistols were produced; a few saw service in the Vietnam War, and were featured in the James Bond book and movie You Only Live Twice, the Matt Helm film Murderers' Row, as well as one of The Man from U.N.C.L.E. novels, The Monster Wheel Affair. At about the same general size as the Colt M1911, the Gyrojet was considerably lighter at only 22 ounces (625 g), as the structure was mostly made of Zamac, a zinc alloy. The weapon was cocked by sliding forward a lever above the trigger to pull a round into the gun; the lever sprang back when the trigger was pulled. The lever hit the bullet on the nose, driving it into the firing pin. As the round left the chamber, it pushed the lever forward again to recock it. The pistol lacked a removable magazine; rounds had to be pushed down from the open "bolt" and then held in place by quickly sliding a cover over them on the top of the gun. Reloading quickly was impossible.

The testers suggested that the (secret) manufacturing process was designed to achieve this effect. However, independent analysis of those testers' own published data shows that their conclusions were incorrectly calculated. The projectile's acceleration actually started out low and continually increased over the bullet's measured flight.

Variants

Gyrojet MkI
Aside from a few Gyrojets tested by the United States military, most Gyrojets were sold on the commercial market starting in the mid-1960s. These were Mark I Gyrojets, which launched a .51 caliber rocket, and had ammunition that was costly to produce and buy.

Gyrojet MkII
In 1968, the U.S. Gun Control Act of 1968 created a new legal term, the destructive device. Under the new law, any weapon firing an explosive-filled projectile over a half-inch in diameter was considered a destructive device and required paying a tax and obtaining a license. The registration process was changed several years later, but in the interim, MBA created the legal Gyrojet Mark II, firing a .49 caliber rocket.

Gyrojet assault rifle
Assault rifle variant with M16-type ergonomics tested by the US Army. This variant had full auto capability and a removable grip inserted magazine. To increase ammo capacity, it is possible this rifle was chambered in the 6 mm caliber.

Gyrojet carbine
Came with a rifle type stock, pistol grip and scope.

Gyrojet Derringer

Derringer pistol with an upper barrel chambered for the Gyrojet round.

Gyrojet flare launcher

The Gyrojet principle was also examined for use in survival flare guns, and a similar idea was explored for a grenade launcher. The emergency-survival flare version (A/P25S-5A) was used for many years as a standard USAF issue item in survival kits, vests, and for forward operations signaling, with flares available in white, green, blue, and red. Its rounded-nose projectile was designed to ricochet through trees and clear an over canopy of branches.

Gyrojet Lancejet
An underwater firearm variant of the Gyrojet called the "Lancejet" was considered for use by the United States military. It was planned and tested but not adopted; the inaccuracy of the weapon eventually removed it from consideration.

Gyrojet pepperbox pistol
An experimental twelve-barrel Gyrojet pepperbox-type pistol was planned to be used, but was not, in the film version of You Only Live Twice.

Gyrojet conversion gun

The Studies and Observations Group (SOG) of the U.S. military in Vietnam in 1967 saw an opportunity to try out one of the SOG's new developments, a revolutionary rocket pistol called a "Gyrojet". In one test, a rocket round punched through an old truck door and into a water-filled 55-gallon drum, almost exiting its opposite side. SOG men also test-fired it through sandbag walls and even tree trunks.

See also

References

External links 
 gyrojet.net
 Gyrojet
 www.deathwind.com/project.htm The Deathwind Project. Archived link– updated versions of the original concept
 www.deathwind.com/review_5.htm Rocket Pistols in Vietnam Archive link – David Kirschbaum's recollections of actually carrying and using one in combat
 "Deadly Zip Gun for the Missile Age", LIFE, 27 May 1966
 Patents
 Testing GYROJET Rocket Guns – Why were they a commercial failure? Video includes high-speed photography of rounds in flight.

Caseless firearms
Firearms of the United States
Rocket launchers
Underwater firearms